Eueana niveociliaria is a moth of the family Geometridae first described by Gottlieb August Wilhelm Herrich-Schäffer in 1870. It is found in the US state of Florida, as well as on the Bahamas, Cuba and Jamaica.

The wingspan is about 20 mm.

The larvae feed on Krugiodendron ferreum.

References

Moths described in 1870
Geometrinae